Karcag is a large town in Jász-Nagykun-Szolnok county, in the Northern Great Plain region of central Hungary.

Geography

Transport

Karcag has its own railway station, but InterCity trains do not stop here.

Politics
The current mayor of Karcag is László Dobos (Fidesz-KDNP).

The local Municipal Assembly, elected at the 2019 local government elections, is made up of 12 members (1 Mayor, 8 Individual constituencies MEPs and 3 Compensation List MEPs) divided into this political parties and alliances:

Twin towns – sister cities

Karcag is twinned with:

Cristuru Secuiesc, Romania (1990)
Kunszentmiklós, Hungary (2009)
Lazdijai, Lithuania (2004)
Lednice, Czech Republic (2006)
Merki District, Kazakhstan (1998)
Moldava nad Bodvou, Slovakia (1998)
Schwarzheide, Germany (2004)
Stara Moravica (Bačka Topola), Serbia (1994)

Notable people
 (died in 1770), the last speaker of the Cuman language
Colonel Michael de Kovats (1724–1779), the father of the US cavalry, a Hungarian hussar was born in Karcag
Avram Hershko (born 1937), Israeli biochemist and Nobel laureate in Chemistry
Margit Sebők (1939–2000), painter and educator
Kevin Varga (born 1996), footballer
Mihály Varga (born 1965), politician, since 2013 Minister of National Economy

References

External links

 in Hungarian, English, German and Italian
 

Populated places in Jász-Nagykun-Szolnok County